Thomas Koelewijn (born 18 December 1988) is a Dutch volleyball player, a member of Netherlands men's national volleyball team and French club Montpellier UC.

Career
With his national team he achieved gold medal of 2012 European League. In 2015 he moved to Polish club Indykpol AZS Olsztyn. After season he went to French team Montpellier UC.

Sporting achievements

Clubs
 2013/2014  Belgium Cup 2014, with VC Antwerpen
 2013/2014  Belgium Championship, with VC Antwerpen

National team
 2012  European League

References

External links
FIVB profile

1988 births
Living people
People from Kampen, Overijssel
Dutch men's volleyball players
Dutch expatriate sportspeople in Belgium
Expatriate volleyball players in Belgium
Dutch expatriate sportspeople in France
Expatriate volleyball players in France
Dutch expatriate sportspeople in Poland
Expatriate volleyball players in Poland
AZS Olsztyn players
Sportspeople from Overijssel